Mystic Hot Springs, previously known as Monroe Hot Springs and Cooper Hot Springs are located in northeastern Monroe, Utah.

History

The hot mineral springs were used by the local indigenous peoples including the Ute, Piute, Shoshone and their ancestors. Early settlers used the springs later, as they were a stop on the Old Spanish Trail. In 1886, Thomas Cooper and his family homesteaded the land on which the springs are located. In 1905 the Coopers built a bathhouse. Later the property was developed to include a dance hall and cabins. In 1930, a Mr. Farnsworth purchased the property and led the house band during events in the dance hall. In the 1970s the structures were renovated, and in 1995, the name was changed from Monroe Hot Springs to Mystic Hot Springs. Mike Ginsburg purchased the property in 1996, and the tradition of music concerts continued at the springs.

Geology
The hydrothermal system is located within the zone of activity of the Sevier Fault. The geothermally heated water has mixed with minerals in the surrounding rocks, creating rust-colored travertine terraces.

Water profile

The spring water emerges from the ground at 168 °F (76 °C) and contains calcium carbonate, magnesium, iron and other minerals.

Location
The hot springs are located at 475 East 100 North

See also
 List of hot springs in the United States
 List of hot springs in the world

References

Hot springs of Utah
Bodies of water of Sevier County, Utah
Balneotherapy